Bulbophyllum flavum is a species of orchid in the genus Bulbophyllum.
The species epithet flavum is Latin for yellow and indicates its flower colour.

References

External links
The Bulbophyllum-Checklist
The Internet Orchid Species Photo Encyclopedia

flavum